The Union Local School District serves Belmont County, Ohio and other surrounding areas. There are three schools in the district: Union Local Elementary School, Union Local Middle School, and Union Local High School. The schools are located on the same piece of land on Route 149. The schools are approximately 1 mile from Morristown, Ohio. The school is nicknamed the "Jets" and is a member of the Ohio Valley Athletic Conference.

History 
Union Local School District formed in 1959 with the combining of Smith Twp., Belmont, Bethesda, and Union Twp. schools. Flushing joined in the late 1960s. Union Local Elementary and Middle schools consolidated in 1998. Centerville (Smith Twp.), Morristown (Union Twp.), Belmont, Bethesda, and Flushing all combined to form the middle and elementary School.

Board of education 
 Terry Puperi, President
 Ed Stenger, Vice President
 Janet Hissrich, Treasurer
 Koel Davia
 Dan Lucas
 Billy Porter
Shaun Roe
 Ben Porter, Superintendent

School administrators 
 High School and Middle School Principal: Joel Davia
 Athletic Director: Nick Nardo
 Elementary School Principal: Pre-K-2 Dana Kendziorski, 3-5 Zack Powell

See also 
 East Central Ohio ESC

External links 
 
 
 

Education in Belmont County, Ohio
School districts in Ohio
School districts established in 1959
1959 establishments in Ohio